Kim Nikolaevich Slavin (February 25, 1928 in Leningrad, USSR — February 14, 1991 in Leningrad, USSR) was a Soviet Russian painter, a member of the Leningrad Union of Artists, who lived and worked in Leningrad. Kim Slavin regarded as one of representatives of the Leningrad school of painting, most famous for his landscape paintings. For over forty years, Slavin kept a detailed diary, which was published after his death by his wife, Nina Slavina, a famous painter on porcelain.

See also
 Leningrad School of Painting
 List of 20th-century Russian painters
 List of painters of Saint Petersburg Union of Artists
 Saint Petersburg Union of Artists

References

Sources 
 Осенняя выставка произведений ленинградских художников 1958 года. Каталог. - Л: Художник РСФСР, 1959. - с.25.
 Выставка произведений ленинградских художников 1960 года. Каталог. - Л: Художник РСФСР, 1961. - с.39.
 Республиканская художественная выставка «Советская Россия». Каталог. - М: Советский художник, 1960. - с.76.
 Выставка произведений ленинградских художников 1961 года. Каталог. - Л: Художник РСФСР, 1964. - с.37.
 Осенняя выставка произведений ленинградских художников 1962 года. Каталог. - Л: Художник РСФСР, 1962. - с.25.
 Ленинград. Зональная выставка. - Л: Художник РСФСР, 1965. - с.50.
 Каталог весенней выставки произведений ленинградских художников 1965 года. — Л: Художник РСФСР, 1970. - с.28.
 Осенняя выставка произведений ленинградских художников 1968 года. Каталог. - Л: Художник РСФСР, 1971. - с.15.
 Весенняя выставка произведений ленинградских художников 1969 года. Каталог. - Л: Художник РСФСР, 1970. - с.17.
 Весенняя выставка произведений ленинградских художников 1971 года. Каталог. - Л: Художник РСФСР, 1972. - с.15.
 По родной стране. Выставка произведений художников Ленинграда. 50 Летию образования СССР посвящается. Каталог. - Л: Художник РСФСР, 1974. - с.24.
 Весенняя выставка произведений ленинградских художников. Каталог. - Л: Художник РСФСР, 1974. - с.10.
 Наш современник. Зональная выставка произведений ленинградских художников 1975 года. Каталог. - Л: Художник РСФСР, 1980. - с.24.
 Пятая республиканская выставка «Советская Россия». - М: Советский художник, 1975. - с.42.
 Изобразительное искусство Ленинграда. Каталог выставки. - Л: Художник РСФСР, 1976. - с.30.
 Выставка произведений ленинградских художников, посвящённая 60-летию Великого Октября. - Л: Художник РСФСР, 1982. - с.21.
 Дмитренко А. Человек на своей земле // Ленинградская правда, 1977, 20 ноября.
 Зональная выставка произведений ленинградских художников 1980 года. Каталог. - Л: Художник РСФСР, 1983. - с.23.
 Леняшин В. Поиски художественной правды // Художник. 1981, № 1. С.8-17.
 Справочник членов Ленинградской организации Союза художников РСФСР. Л., Художник РСФСР, 1987. С.120.
 Интерьер и натюрморт. Выставка произведений живописи художников Российской Федерации. Каталог. - Л: Художник РСФСР, 1991. - с.54.
 Васильева Н., Славина Н. Ким Николаевич Славин. - СПб: Художник России, 1993.
 Связь времён.  1932–1997. Художники - члены Санкт - Петербургского Союза художников России. Каталог выставки. СПб., ЦВЗ "Манеж", 1997. С.298.
 Matthew Cullerne Bown. A Dictionary of Twentieth Century Russian And Soviet Painters. 1900 — 1980s. — London: Izomar Limited, 1998.
 Славин К., Славина Н. Были мы молоды. СПб., РИД, 2000. .
 Sergei V. Ivanov. Unknown Socialist Realism. The Leningrad School. Saint Petersburg, NP-Print Edition, 2007. P.19, 24, 392, 393, 396-399, 439. , .
 Санкт-Петербургская государственная художественно-промышленная академия им. А. Л. Штиглица. Кафедра монументально-декоративной живописи. СПб., Искусство России. 2011. С. 101.

1928 births
1991 deaths
Painters from Saint Petersburg
20th-century Russian painters
Russian male painters
Soviet painters
Landscape artists
Socialist realist artists
Leningrad School artists
Members of the Leningrad Union of Artists
Saint Petersburg Stieglitz State Academy of Art and Design alumni
20th-century Russian male artists